The Academy of Canadian Cinema & Television's 19th Gemini Awards were held on December 13, 2004, to honour achievements in Canadian television. The awards show, which was co-hosted by several celebrities, took place at the John Bassett Theatre and was broadcast on CBC Television.

Awards

Best Dramatic Series
Da Vinci’s Inquest - Haddock Entertainment, Barna-Alper Productions, Alliance Atlantis Productions, Canadian Broadcasting Corporation. Producers: Chris Haddock, Laszlo Barna, Arvi Liimatainen
Bliss - Galafilm, Back Alley Film Productions. Producers: Arnie Gelbart, Janis Lundman, Ian Whitehead, Adrienne Mitchell
The Eleventh Hour - Alliance Atlantis Communications. Producers: Ilana Frank, Semi Chellas, Ray Sager, David Wellington, Seaton McLean
Slings & Arrows - Rhombus Media. Producers: Sari Friedland, Niv Fichman, Daniel Iron
Snakes and Ladders - Big Motion Pictures. Producers: Wayne Grigsby, David MacLeod
The Shields Stories - Shaftesbury Films. Producers: Christina Jennings, Scott Garvie, Kim Todd, Laura Harbin, Lori Spring

Best Dramatic Mini-Series or TV Movie
Human Cargo - Force Four Entertainment. Producers: Hugh Beard, Debra Beard, Brian Mckeown, Linda Svendsen
Cowboys and Indians: The J.J. Harper Story - High Definition Pictures, The Film Works, Aboriginal Peoples Television Network, Canadian Broadcasting Corporation. Producers: Eric Jordan, Jeremy Torrie
Elizabeth Rex - Rhombus Media. Producers: Jennifer Jonas, Niv Fichman, Daniel Iron
Open Heart - Barna-Alper/Dreamsmith Entertainment, Movie Central, Canadian Broadcasting Corporation. Producers: Laszlo Barna, Phyllis Platt, Tim Hogan, Brian Dennis
The Incredible Mrs. Ritchie - Showtime Networks, Nomadic Pictures. Producers: Chad Oakes, Michael Frislev

Best Comedy Program or Series
Trailer Park Boys - Showcase, Topsail Entertainment. Producers: Mike Clattenburg, Michael A. Volpe, Barrie Dunn
Puppets Who Kill - Eggplant Picture & Sound. Producers: John Pattison, Marianne Culbert, John Leitch, Shawn Thompson
This Hour Has 22 Minutes - Salter Street Films, Canadian Broadcasting Corporation. Producers: Michael Donovan, Geoff D’Eon, Mark Farrell, Jack Kellum, Susan MacDonald, Jenipher Ritchie
The Newsroom - 100% Film and Television, Canadian Broadcasting Corporation, Showcase, Telefilm Canada. Producers: Ken Finkleman, Jan Peter Meyboom
Corner Gas - CTV Television Network, Prairie Pants Productions. Producers: Brent Butt, Mark Farrell, David Storey, Virginia Thompson
The Red Green Show - Red Green Productions. Producers: David C. Smith, Steve Smith

Best Music, Variety Program or Series
Juno Awards of 2004 - Canadian Academy of Recording Arts and Sciences, CTV Television Network. Producers: John Brunton, Melanie Berry, Barbara Bowlby, Lindsay Cox, Stephen Stohn, Louise Wood
Live at the Rehearsal Hall - Bravo!. Producers: Robert Benson, John Gunn
2003 Much Music Video Music Awards - MuchMusic. Producers: John Kampilis, Sheila Sullivan
ZeD - Canadian Broadcasting Corporation. Producers: McLean Mashingaidze-Greaves, Sudha Krishna, Jennifer Ouano
Painting Daisies - The Dream Team - Canadian Broadcasting Corporation. Producers: Peter Mann, Steve Glassman, Jack Bond

Best Performing Arts Program or Series, or Arts Documentary Program or Series
Men of the Deeps - CTV Television Network, John Walker Productions, Picture Plant, National Film Board of Canada. Producers: John Walker, Terry Greenlaw, Kent Martin
Amelia - Amérimage-Spectra, Media Principia, Echo Media. Producers: Pierre Touchette, Luc Châtelain, Bob Krupinski, Daniel Langlois, Alain Simard
Singing in the Shadow: The Children of Rock Royalty - Handel Productions. Producer: Alan Handel
Naked in the House - Fashion Television. Producers: Marcia Martin, Jay Levine, Adrienne Reid
The Planets - Amérimage-Spectra, Echo Media. Producers: Pierre Touchette, Luc Châtelain, Alain Simard

Best Talk Series
Vicki Gabereau - Canadian Broadcasting Corporation. Producers: Cynthia Ott, Jordan Schwartz
Studio 2 - TVOntario. Producers: Doug Grant, Jane Jankovic
Imprint - TVOntario. Producers: Doug Grant, Linda Dunlop
Hot Type - CBC Newsworld. Producers: Alice Hopton, Dana Glassman, Janet Thomson, Donna Lee Aprile 
CBC News: Sunday - Canadian Broadcasting Corporation. Producers: Stuart Coxe, Carolyn Jack

Best Reality Program or Series
CBC News: Disclosure - The Making of a Political Animal - Canadian Broadcasting Corporation. Producers: Catherine Legge, Jane Mingay, Cecil Rosner, Jim Williamson
Venture - Back to the Floor - Canadian Broadcasting Corporation. Producers: Patsy Pehleman, Chad Paulin, Tracie Tighe
Hooked Up - Lone Eagle Entertainment. Producers: Michael Geddes, Michael Frislev, Chad Oakes, Maria Pimentel, Tom Powers
Kenny vs. Spenny - Canadian Broadcasting Corporation, Cinefornia, Blueprint Entertainment, Eggplant Picture & Sound, KVS Productions. Producers: Abby Finer, Noreen Halpern, Kenny Hotz, Ira Levy, John Morayniss, Spencer Rice, Kirsten Scollie, Peter Williamson 
Zoo Diaries - DocuTainment Productions, Microtainment Plus International, Infinite Monkeys Productions, Atlantic 16 Productions. Producers: Garry Blue, Howard Bernstein, Mark Shekter
Buy Me - Whalley-Abbey Media. Producers: Nikila Cole, Hans Rosenstein

Donald Brittain Award for Best Social/Political Documentary Program
Dying at Grace - TVOntario. Producers: Rudy Buttignol, Allan King
CBC News: Sunday - Deadline Iraq: Uncensored - Canadian Broadcasting Corporation. Producers: Aaron Williams, Eric Foss, Douglas Arrowsmith, Greg Kelly, Stuart Coxe
Dying To Be Free - Zimbabwe's Struggle For Change. Producer: David Belluz
Short Infinity - National Film Board of Canada. Producers: Yves Bisaillon, Jean Lemire
The Man Who Could Be King - Nomad Films. Producers: Nancy Ing-Duclos, Edith Champagne, Mark Johnston

Best Documentary Series
The Nature of Things - Canadian Broadcasting Corporation. Producer: Michael Allder
Rough Cuts - CBC Newsworld. Producer: Andrew Johnson
The View from Here - TVOntario). Producer: Rudy Buttignol
The Passionate Eye - The Passionate Eye Canadian Showcase - Canadian Broadcast Corporation. Producers: Catherine Olsen, Charlotte Odele, Diane Rotteau
Turning Points of History - Barna-Alper Productions, Connections Productions. Producers: Laszlo Barna, Alan Mendelsohn

Best History Documentary Program
Radio Revolution: The Rise and Fall of the Big 8 - Markham Street Films. Producer: Judy Holm
City of Ruins: The Halifax Explosion - Canadian Broadcasting Corporation. Producers: Mark Starowicz, Alan Mendelsohn, Sally Reardon
Sleeping Tigers: The Asahi Baseball Story - National Film Board of Canada. Producers: Karen King, Silva Basmajian
From a Place Called War 1939-1945: Dawn of Deliverance - Northern Sky Entertainment. Producer: Wayne Abbott
Notman's Canada - TVOntario. Producers: Rudy Buttignol, Murray Battle, Andrea Nemtin

Best Biography Documentary Program
Arctic Dreamer: The Lonely Quest Stories of the War of Vilhjalmur Stefansson - National Film Board of Canada, White Pine Pictures. Producers: Lindalee Tracey, Peter Raymont.
Helen's War: Portrait of a Dissident - Sonja Armstrong Productions. Producer: Sonja Armstrong, Anne Pick
Turning Points of History - Neighbours: Freud and Hitler in Vienna - Barna-Alper Productions, Connections Productions. Producers: Alan Mendelsohn, Laszlo Barna
The Canadian Experience: Sisters in the Wilderness - Canadian Broadcasting Corporation, CineNorth. Producers: Lisa Ellenwood, Susan Dando.
The Spirit of Annie Mae - National Film Board of Canada. Producer: Kent Martin

Best Science, Technology, Nature, Environment or Adventure Documentary Program
Suzuki Speaks - Avanti Pictures. Producers: Cathy Chilco, Tony Papa
Sex, Drugs and Middle Age - Canadian Broadcasting Corporation. Producer: Ann Marie Redmond
The Nature of Things - Corporate Agriculture: The Hollow Men - Canadian Broadcasting Corporation. Producers: Michael Allder, Ray Burley
The Eye of the Son - TVOntario. Producers: Rudy Buttignol, Jason Rodi, Robbie Hart
Garden Mimics - Bullfrog Films. Producer: Susan Fleming

Best News Information Series
the fifth estate - Canadian Broadcasting Corporation. Producers: David Studer, Sally Reardon
W5 - CTV Television Network. Producers: Malcolm Fox, Anton Koschany
CTV National News - Question Period - CTV Television Network. Producers: Jana Juginovic, Joanne MacDonald
Foreign Assignment - CBC Newsworld. Producers: Eric Rankin, Jet Belgraver
The Docket - CBC News. Producers: Lisa Taylor, Susan Rogers

Best News Magazine Segment
The National/CBC News - Hana's Suitcase - Canadian Broadcasting Corporation. Producers: Joe Schlesinger, Jet Belgraver, Avi Lev
CBC News: Sunday - Canadian Broadcasting Corporation. Producers: Eric Foss, Evan Solomon, Katie MacGuire, Aaron Williams
CBC News: Disclosure - Dead Silence - Canadian Broadcasting Corporation. Producers: Harvey Cashore, Scott Anderson, Vera-Lynn Kubinec
W5 - 419 Fraud - CTV Television Network. Producers: Tom Clark, Elizabeth Cook, Robert Osborne, Denis Langlois
The National/CBC News - Uganda's Forgotten War - Canadian Broadcasting Corporation. Producers: Melanie Verhaeghe, Jamie Hopkins, Tania White

Best Newscast
CityNews: CityPulse at Six - Citytv. Producers: Katia Del Col, Dan Comi, Tina Cortese, Stephen Hurlbut
The National/CBC News - Canadian Broadcasting Corporation. Producers: Bob Waller, Fred Parker, Mark Harrison, Lynn Kelly, Jonathan Whitten
CTV National News - CTV Television Network. Producers: Wendy Freeman, Tom Haberstroh, David Hughes

Best News Special Event Coverage
CBC News: The 2010 Olympic Decision - Canadian Broadcasting Corporation. Producers: Mark Bulgutch, Fred Parker, Tom Dinsmore
Global National - Kelowna Fires - Global News. Producers: George Browne, Doriana Temolo, Kevin Newman, Elaine McKay, Erin Lawrence
CBC News: The Progressive Conservative Leadership Convention - Canadian Broadcasting Corporation. Producers: Mark Bulgutch, Fred Parker
CTV News - Power Blackout - CTV Television Network. Producers: Kenton Boston, Tom Haberstroh, Brian LeBold
Toronto Tonight: The Cecilia Tragedy - Producers: Mike Karapita, Zev Shalev

Best Lifestyle or General Interest Series
SexTV - CHUM Television, Corus Entertainment. Producers: Pedro Orrego, Marcia Martin
Debbie Travis' Facelift - Whalley-Abbey Media. Producers: Nikila Cole, Debbie Travis, Hans Rosenstein
Recreating Eden - Merit Motion Pictures. Producer: Merit Jensen-Carr
Saturday Night at the Movies - The Interviews - TVOntario. Producers: Rudy Buttignol, Risa Shuman, Murray Battle
English Teachers, Part 2 - WestWind Pictures. Producers: David C. Hansen, Clark Donnelly, Michael Snook, Maria Spinarski
FashionTelevision - Citytv. Producers: Marcia Martin, Jay Levine, Howard Brull

Best Lifestyle/Practical Information Segment
ZeD - More Than Skin Deep - Canadian Broadcasting Corporation. Producers: Grant Greschuk, Scott Winlaw, David Ozier
Marketplace - Canadian Broadcasting Corporation. Producers: Krista Erickson, Andreas Wesley, Don Chung, Aileen McBride, Blair Clark
POV Sports - Canadian Broadcasting Corporation. Producer: Andrea Griffith 
Planet Parent - Telefactory. Producers: Derek Miller, Vanessa Huang, Jessy Tse, Jerry Vienneau, Denis Langlois

Best Practical Information Series
The Surreal Gourmet - Salad Daze Productions. Producers: Lon J. Hall, Dale Burshtein, Beth Fanjoy
Holmes on Homes - General Purpose Entertainment. Producer: Scott Clark McNeil
Licence to Grill - Knight Enterprises. Producers: Chris Knight, Kathy Doherty
Me, My House & I - Mountain Road Productions. Producers: Tim Alp, Brigitte Gall
Stylin' Gypsies - W Network. Producers: Michelle Metivier, Paula Butorac, Mary Benadiba

Best Animated Program or Series
Doodlez - Cellar Door Productions. Producer: Gretha Rose
Fair Phyllis - National Film Board of Canada. Producers: Jennifer Torrance, Jerry Krepakevich
King - Decode Entertainment, Funbag Animation Studios. Producers: Steve Denure, Gordon Coulthart, Beth Stevenson, Frank Taylor
Miss Spider's Sunny Patch Kids - Nelvana. Producers: Scott Dyer, Nicholas Callaway, Michael Hirsh, David Kirk, Paul W. Robertson, Nadine van der Velde
Noël Noël - National Film Board of Canada. Producers: Marc Bertrand, Marcy Page, Jean-Jacques Leduc

Best Pre-School Program or Series
Poko - Halifax Film Company. Producers: Michael Donovan, Charles Bishop, Jeff Rosen
The Save-Ums! - C.O.R.E., Decode Entertainment. Producers: Kym Hyde, Neil Court, Steve Denure, Beth Stevenson, John Mariella
Nanalan' - The Grogs, Lenz Entertainment. Producers: Jason Hopley, Jack Lenz, Jamie Shannon
The Hoobs - The Jim Henson Company, Decode Entertainment. Producers: Mellie Buse, Angus Fletcher, Steve Denure, Beth Stevenson, Peter Coogan, Sue Taylor
The Berenstain Bears - Nelvana, AGOGO Entertainment. Producers: Scott Dyer, Stan and Jan Berenstain, Michael Hirsh, Steven Ching
The Big Comfy Couch - Radical Sheep Productions. Producers: Cheryl Wagner, John Leitch, Rob Mills

Best Children’s or Youth Fiction Program or Series
Degrassi: The Next Generation - Bell Media, Epitome Pictures. Producers: Stephen Stohn, Linda Schuyler
Edgemont - Canadian Broadcasting Corporation, Omnifilm Entertainment. Producers: Michael Chechik, Ian Weir
Strange Days at Blake Holsey High - Fireworks Entertainment. Producers: Tony Thatcher, Adam Haight, Jeff F. King, Kevin May
Jacob Two-Two - Nelvana, Salter Street Films. Producers: Scott Dyer, Peter Moss, Michael Hirsh
Radio Free Roscoe - Decode Entertainment. Producers: Steve Denure, Neil Court, John Delmage, Doug McRobb, Will McRobb, Brent Piaskoski, Beth Stevenson

Best Children's or Youth Non-Fiction Program or Series
Swap TV - Breakthrough Entertainment. Producers: Tatyana Terzopoulos, Ira Levy, Kirsty Nordal, Kirsten Scollie, Heather Findlay, Peter Williamson
21c - CTV Television Network. Producers: Malcolm Fox, Stephen Grant
POV Sports - Canadian Broadcasting Corporation. Producers: Paul Papadopoulos, Christopher Greaves
Street Cents - Canadian Broadcasting Corporation. Producers: Barbara Kennedy, Wendy Purves
VOX - TVOntario. Producer: Maria Farano, Pat Ellingson

Best Sports Program or Series
Hockey Night in Canada, Hockey Day in Canada - CBC Sports. Producers: Joel Darling, Chris Irwin, Sherali Najak 
Life and Times - Destiny: The Life and Times of Daniel Igali - Canadian Broadcasting Corporation. Producers: Joel Gordon, Gabriela Schonbach, Michael Chechik
NHL on TSN - Pre-Game - TSN. Producers: David Stiff, Ken Volden, Mark Milliere
Spruce Meadows Horse Diaries: 2003 World Cup Finals - Spruce Meadows Ltd. Producers: Linda Southern-Heathcott, Ian M. Allison
Roger Neilson: A Tribute - Sportsnet. Producer: David Tredgett

Best Live Sporting Event
2003 UCI Road World Championships - Elite Men's Final - CBC Sports. Producers: Don Peppin, Jeff Pearlman
CFL on CBC: 91st Grey Cup Championship - CBC Sports. Producers: Mike Brannagan, Trevor Pilling, Joe Scarcelli
CFL : Wendy's Friday Night Football - Saskatchewan at Hamilton - TSN. Producer: Paul McLean

Best Interactive
Time Trackers Interactive Website - TVOntario. Producers: Pat Ellingson, Marney Malabar, Phil McCordic, Jeremy Rodgers, Andrew Ebert, Mike Fitzgerald, Catherine Thomson, Angela Lee
Degrassi: The Next Generation - Bell Media, Epitome Pictures). Producers: Stephen Stohn, Linda Schuyler, Roma Khanna, Raja Khanna
Chilly Beach: www.chillybeach.com featuring Polar Magnate - March Entertainment. Producers: Daniel Hawes, Don Hutchison, Craig McKee, Ronald Ruslim
Canadian Idol: idol.ctv.ca - Insight Productions, 19 Entertainment, FremantleMedia North America. Producers: Aaron Bernardo, Noelle Paredes, Wendy Smith 
Deafplanet: deafplanet.com - Marblemedia, Canadian Cultural Society of the Deaf. Producers: Mark J.W. Bishop, Matthew Hornburg

Best Direction in a Dramatic Program or Mini-Series
Brad Turner - Human Cargo (Force Four Entertainment)
Norma Bailey - Cowboys and Indians: The J.J. Harper Story (High Definition Pictures/The Film Works/APTN/CBC)
Bruce Pittman - Shattered City: The Halifax Explosion (CBC Television)
Anne Wheeler - The Investigation (CTV/Muse Entertainment/Studio Eight Productions/Voice Pictures)

Best Direction in a Dramatic Series
Sturla Gunnarsson - Da Vinci’s Inquest - Bury My Own Bones (Haddock Entertainment/Barna-Alper Productions/Alliance Atlantis/CBC)
George Mihalka - Da Vinci’s Inquest - A Man When He's Down (Haddock Entertainment/Barna-Alper Productions/Alliance Atlantis/CBC)
Kari Skogland - The Eleventh Hour - Swimmers (Alliance Atlantis) 
Bruce McDonald - This Is Wonderland - Episode 1 (Muse Entertainment/Indian Grove Productions) 
Scott Smith - This Is Wonderland - Episode 10 (Muse Entertainment/Indian Grove Productions)

Best Direction in a News Information Program or Series
Michael Gruzuk - Marketplace - Grand Theft Auto (CBC)
Catherine Legge - CBC News: Disclosure - Download This! (CBC)
Marie Caloz - the fifth estate - No Way Home (CBC)
Neil Docherty - the fifth estate - Dead in the Water (CBC)
Claude Vickery - the fifth estate - Run For Your Life (CBC)

Best Direction in a Documentary Program
Peter Raymont - The World Stopped Watching (Harold Crooks/White Pine Pictures)
Allan King - Dying at Grace (TVOntario)
John Walker - Men of the Deeps (CTV/John Walker Productions/Picture Plant/NFB)
Kun Chang - Short Infinity (NFB)
Sarah Goodman - Army of One (Fovea Films/Red Storm Productions)

Best Direction in a Documentary Series
Caroline Underwood - The Nature of Things - Arctic Mission (CBC) 
Tim Wolochatiuk - Betrayal! (American World Pictures/Gryphon Films)
Chris Triffo - ExtraOrdinary Lives (Wavelength Entertainment)
Gary Lang - Forensic Factor - Future Crime (Exploration Production)
Leslie Côté - Stories of Mothers and Daughters (Breakthrough Entertainment)

Best Direction in a Comedy Program or Series
Shawn Thompson - Puppets Who Kill - Rocko Gets a Lung (Eggplant Picture & Sound)
Henry Sarwer-Foner - This Hour Has 22 Minutes - Episode 1 (Salter Street Films/CBC)
Mike Clattenburg - Trailer Park Boys - Closer to the Heart (Showcase/Topsail Entertainment)
Shawn Thompson - An American in Canada - Some Like It Hot Zone (S&S Productions/CBC)
Rob W. King - Corner Gas - Cousin Carl (CTV/Prairie Pants Productions)

Best Direction in a Variety Program or Series
Shelagh O'Brien - East Coast Music Awards (East Coast Music Association/CBC Halifax)
Joan Tosoni - Juno Awards of 2004 (Canadian Academy of Recording Arts and Sciences/CTV)
Bob Haller - 2003 MuchMusic Video Awards (MuchMusic)
Mark Lawrence - ZeD (CBC) 
Geoff D'Eon - Christmas in Kabul (Salter Street Films)

Best Direction in a Performing Arts Program or Series
Édouard Lock - Amelia (Amérimage-Spectra/Media Principia/Echo Media)
Mark Adam, Allen Kaeja - Old Country (Kaeja d'Dance Company) 
Veronica Tennant - Shadow Pleasures (Eccentrics Things) 
Nicholas de Pencier - Streetcar (Mercury Films)
Barbara Willis Sweete - The Firebird (Rhombus Media)

Best Direction in a Lifestyle/Practical Information Program or Series
Gwynne Basen - Recreating Eden (Merit Motion Pictures)
Romano D'Andrea - Arresting Design (Planetworks)
Edward Mowbray - Chef At Large (Ocean Entertainment)
Donna Leon - Island Vets 
Edward Mowbray - The Food Hunter (Ocean Entertainment)

Best Direction in a Children's or Youth Program or Series
Philip Earnshaw - Degrassi: The Next Generation - Pride (Bell Media/Epitome Pictures) 
Mike Fallows - Miss Spider's Sunny Patch Kids (Nelvana)
Chuck Rubin - Poko - Poko on the Moon (Halifax Film Company)
Don McBrearty - Ghost Cat (Cellar Door Productions/Whizbang Films)
Martin Wood - The Impossible Elephant (Edge Entertainment)

Best Direction in a Live Sporting Event
Paul Hemming - CFL : Wendy's Friday Night Football - Saskatchewan at Hamilton (TSN)
Ron Forsythe - 2003 Heritage Classic: Mega Stars Game & NHL Game (CBC Sports)
Paul Hemming - 2004 World Junior Ice Hockey Championships - Gold Medal Game (TSN)

Best Writing in a Dramatic Program or Mini-Series
Linda Svendsen, Brian Mckeown - Human Cargo (Force Four Entertainment)
Andrew Rai Berzins, Roland Rhodes - Cowboys and Indians: The J.J. Harper Story (High Definition Pictures/The Film Works/APTN/CBC)
Raymond Storey - Open Heart (Barna-Alper/Dreamsmith Entertainment/Movie Central/CBC)

Best Writing in a Dramatic Series
Chris Haddock, Alan Di Fiore - Da Vinci’s Inquest - Bury My Own Bones (Haddock Entertainment/Barna-Alper Productions/Alliance Atlantis/CBC)
Chris Haddock, Alan Di Fiore - Da Vinci’s Inquest - A Man When He's Down (Haddock Entertainment/Barna-Alper Productions/Alliance Atlantis/CBC)
Tassie Cameron - The Eleventh Hour - Georgia (Alliance Atlantis) 
Susan Coyne, Mark McKinney, Bob Martin - Slings & Arrows - Madness in Great Ones (Rhombus Media)
Wayne Grigsby - Snakes and Ladders - Section 24 (Big Motion Pictures)

Best Writing in a Comedy or Variety Program or Series
Rick Mercer - Made in Canada - The Last Show (Salter Street Films/Island Edge)
Jackie Torrens, Mike Clattenburg, Robb Wells, John Paul Tremblay - Trailer Park Boys - If I Can't Smoke and Swear I'm Fucked (Showcase/Topsail Entertainment)
Mark Farrell, Brent Butt - Corner Gas - Tax Man (CTV/Prairie Pants Productions)
John Pattison - Puppets Who Kill - Dan and the Necrophiliac (Eggplant Picture & Sound)
Kevin White, Mark Critch, Mark Farrell, Cathy Jones, Shaun Majumder, Peter McBain, Jennifer Robertson, Irwin Barker, Mary Walsh, Greg Thomey - This Hour Has 22 Minutes - Episode 1 (Salter Street Films/CBC)

Best Writing in an Information Program or Series
Bob McKeown - the fifth estate - Run For Your Life (CBC)
Evan Solomon - CBC News: Sunday (Canadian Broadcasting Corporation)
Linden MacIntyre - the fifth estate - Death of a Beauty Queen (CBC)
Terry Milewski - The National/CBC News - Cover Up (CBC)
Lisa Bowes, Richard Wright - Sports Journal (CBC Sports)

Best Writing in a Documentary Program or Series
John Haslett Cuff - Crimes of the Heart (John Haslett Cuff) 
Mary Lynk - From the Heart: The Life & Times of Janet Conners (NFB)
Michael McNamara - Radio Revolution: The Rise and Fall of the Big 8 (Markham Street Films)
Don Murray - The Man Who Could Be King (Nomad Films)
Michael Maclear - Vietnam: Ghosts of War (Memory Films)

Best Writing in a Children's or Youth's Program or Series
Jason Hopley, Jamie Shannon - Nanalan' - Free (The Grogs/Lenz Entertainment)
Nicole Demerse, James Hurst, Shelley Scarrow - Degrassi: The Next Generation - Accidents Will Happen (Bell Media/Epitome Pictures)
Ian Weir - Edgemont - You Gotta Have Friends - CBC/Omnifilm Entertainment)
Jennifer Cowan - Edgemont - Two Guys and a Baby - CBC/Omnifilm Entertainment)
John van Bruggen - Jacob Two-Two - Jacob Two-Two and the Purloined Hockey Card (Nelvana/Salter Street Films)
Robert C. Cooper - The Impossible Elephant (Edge Entertainment)

Best Performance by an Actor in a Leading Role in a Dramatic Program or Mini-Series
Brent Carver - Elizabeth Rex (Rhombus Media)
Nicholas Campbell - Human Cargo (Force Four Entertainment)
Bayo Akinfemi - Human Cargo (Force Four Entertainment)
Vincent Walsh - Shattered City: The Halifax Explosion (CBC Television)
Nicholas Lea - The Investigation (CTV/Muse Entertainment/Studio Eight Productions/Voice Pictures)

Best Performance by an Actress in a Leading Role in a Dramatic Program or Mini-Series
Diane D'Aquila - Elizabeth Rex (Rhombus Media)
Kate Nelligan - Human Cargo (Force Four Entertainment)
Megan Follows - Open Heart (Barna-Alper/Dreamsmith Entertainment/Movie Central/CBC)

Best Performance by an Actor in a Continuing Leading Dramatic Role
Paul Gross - Slings & Arrows - A Mirror Up To Nature (Rhombus Media)
Nicholas Campbell - Da Vinci’s Inquest - Bury My Own Bones (Haddock Entertainment/Barna-Alper Productions/Alliance Atlantis/CBC)
Jeff Seymour - The Eleventh Hour - The Missionary Position (Alliance Atlantis) 
Michael Riley - This Is Wonderland - Episode 10 (Muse Entertainment/Indian Grove Productions)
Shawn Doyle - The Eleventh Hour - Hard Seven (Alliance Atlantis)

Best Performance by an Actress in a Continuing Leading Dramatic Role
Catherine Disher - Snakes and Ladders - Section 24 (Big Motion Pictures)
Tracy Waterhouse - Blue Murder - Midnight Man (Barna-Alper Productions/Canwest/North Bend Films)
Waneta Storms - The Eleventh Hour - The Revenge Specialist (Alliance Atlantis)
Martha Burns - Slings & Arrows - A Mirror Up To Nature (Rhombus Media)
Cara Pifko - This Is Wonderland - Episode 7 (Muse Entertainment/Indian Grove Productions)

Best Performance by an Actor in a Guest Role Dramatic Series
Richard Chevolleau - The Eleventh Hour - Hard Seven (Alliance Atlantis)
Gordon Pinsent - The Eleventh Hour - Wonderland (Alliance Atlantis)
Doug McGrath - This Is Wonderland - Episode 13 (Muse Entertainment/Indian Grove Productions) 
Peter Outerbridge - This Is Wonderland - Episode 7 (Muse Entertainment/Indian Grove Productions) 
Rogue Johnston - This Is Wonderland - Episode 9 (Muse Entertainment/Indian Grove Productions)

Best Performance by an Actress in a Guest Role Dramatic Series
Nicky Guadagni - Blue Murder - Eyewitness (Barna-Alper Productions/Canwest/North Bend Films)
Janet Bailey - Blue Murder - Upstairs Downstairs (Barna-Alper Productions/Canwest/North Bend Films)
Diana Leblanc - Snakes and Ladders - Squattergate (Big Motion Pictures)
Catherine Fitch - This Is Wonderland - Episode 8 (Muse Entertainment/Indian Grove Productions) 
Angela Asher - This Is Wonderland - Episode 5 (Muse Entertainment/Indian Grove Productions) 
Clare Coulter - This Is Wonderland - Episode 6 (Muse Entertainment/Indian Grove Productions)

Best Performance by an Actor in a Featured Supporting Role in a Dramatic Series
Michael Murphy - This Is Wonderland - Episode 3 (Muse Entertainment/Indian Grove Productions) 
Eric Peterson - This Is Wonderland - Episode 4 (Muse Entertainment/Indian Grove Productions) 
Michael Healey - This Is Wonderland - Episode 10 (Muse Entertainment/Indian Grove Productions) 
Tom Rooney - This Is Wonderland - Episode 1 (Muse Entertainment/Indian Grove Productions) 
Mark McKinney - Slings & Arrows - Madness in Great Ones (Rhombus Media)

Best Performance by an Actress in a Featured Supporting Role in a Dramatic Series
Rachel McAdams - Slings & Arrows - A Mirror Up To Nature (Rhombus Media)
Jennifer Irwin - Slings & Arrows - A Mirror Up To Nature (Rhombus Media)
Andrea Robinson - Doc - Angels in Waiting (Paxson Entertainment/Pebblehut Productions)

Best Performance by an Actor in a Featured Supporting Role in a Dramatic Program or Mini-Series
Ted Dykstra - Shattered City: The Halifax Explosion (CBC Television)
Currie Graham - Cowboys and Indians: The J.J. Harper Story (High Definition Pictures/The Film Works/APTN/CBC)
Hrothgar Mathews - Human Cargo (Force Four Entertainment)
Hakeem Kae-Kazim - Human Cargo (Force Four Entertainment)
Jeremy Raymond - The Incredible Mrs. Ritchie (Showtime Networks/Nomadic Pictures)

Best Performance by an Actress in a Featured Supporting Role in a Dramatic Program or Mini-Series
Nthati Moshesh - Human Cargo (Force Four Entertainment)
Cara Pifko - Human Cargo (Force Four Entertainment)
Myriam Acharki - Human Cargo (Force Four Entertainment)

Best Individual Performance in a Comedy Program or Series
Gavin Crawford - This Hour Has 22 Minutes - Episode 4 (Salter Street Films/CBC)
Jeremy Hotz - Just for Laughs (Just for Laughs Comedy Festival/Les Films Rozon)
Danny Bhoy - Just for Laughs (Just for Laughs Comedy Festival/Les Films Rozon)
Shaun Majumder - Comedy From the Coast
Gavin Crawford - The Gavin Crawford Show - Oh the Huge Manatee (Idle Mind Productions/Shaftesbury Films)
Russell Peters - Comedy Now! (CTV/Hi Guys Ten Productions)
Roman Danylo - Comedy Inc. (SFA Productions)

Best Ensemble Performance in a Comedy Program or Series
Rick Mercer, Dan Lett, Leah Pinsent, Jackie Torrens, Peter Keleghan - Made in Canada - The Last Show (Salter Street Films/Island Edge)
Brent Butt, Janet Wright, Tara Spencer-Nairn, Nancy Robertson, Eric Peterson, Gabrielle Miller, Fred Ewanuick, Lorne Cardinal - Corner Gas - Face Off (CTV/Prairie Pants Productions)
Rebecca Northan, Paul O’Sullivan, Debra McGrath, Lisa Merchant, Peter Oldring - The Joe Blow Show (The Comedy Network)
Shaun Majumder, Greg Thomey, Cathy Jones, Mary Walsh, Mark Critch - This Hour Has 22 Minutes - Episode 1 (Salter Street Films/CBC)
Jackie Torrens, Cory Bowles, Robb Wells, John Paul Tremblay, Jonathan Torrens, Lucy Decoutere, Barrie Dunn, John Dunsworth, Jeanna Harrison, Sarah Dunsworth-Nickerson, Tyrone Parsons, Patrick Roach, Mike Smith, Shelley Thompson, Michael Jackson - Trailer Park Boys - If I Can't Smoke and Swear I'm Fucked (Showcase/Topsail Entertainment)

Best Performance or Host in a Variety Program or Series
Paul Brandt - 2003 Canadian Country Music Awards (Canadian Country Music Association/Global)
Connie Kaldor - Connie Kaldor at Wood River Hall (VisionTV)
Paul Anka - Paul Anka: RSVP (CBC)
Rick Mercer - Christmas in Kabul (Salter Street Films)
Jully Black - Tonya Lee Williams: Gospel Jubilee (Wilbo Entertainment)

Best Performance in a Performing Arts Program or Series
Peter Chin - Streetcar (Mercury Films)
Nancy Crowley, Mistaya Hemingway, Keir Knight, Chun Hong Li, Bernard Martin, Jason Shipley-Holmes, Zofia Tujaka, Naomi Stikeman, Billy Smith, Andrea Boardman - Amelia (Amérimage-Spectra/Media Principia/Echo Media)
Emma Lu Romerein - From Time to Time
Andy Jones - Andy Jones: To the Wall
Russell Braun - Opening Night (CBC)
Ewa Uziel, Eugene Nakamura, Michele Dumoulin, John Morris Russell, Konstantin Popovic, Dawn Hrycak-Popovic, Kevin Filewych, Henryk Uziel, Valerie Selander Voisey, Andrew McIntosh, Pola Luboniecka, Jonathan Tortolano, Darrett Zusko, Besnik Yzeiri, Gregory Sheldon, Margaret Kapasi, Peter Wiebe - Cross-Canada Candlelight Christmas - Windsor Symphony Orchestra Concert (CBC)

Best Performance in a Preschool Program or Series
Jamie Shannon, Jason Hopley - Nanalan' - Free (The Grogs/Lenz Entertainment)
Rebecca Nagan, Wim Booth, Julie Westwood, Gillie Robic, Mark Jefferis, Don Austen, John Eccleston - The Hoobs (The Jim Henson Company/Decode Entertainment)
Alyson Court - The Big Comfy Couch - Clowning in the Rain (Radical Sheep Productions)

Best Performance in a Children’s or Youth Program or Series
Ellen Page - Ghost Cat (Cellar Door Productions/Whizbang Films)
Jake Epstein - Degrassi: The Next Generation - Should I Stay or Should I Go (Bell Media/Epitome Pictures)
Tom Barnett - Ghost Cat (Cellar Door Productions/Whizbang Films)
Al Mukadam - Radio Free Roscoe - The Awful Truth (Decode Entertainment)
Lauren Collins - renegadepress.com - Skin Deep (Vérité Films)

Best News Anchor
Peter Mansbridge - The National/CBC News - Kabul Afghanistan/Liberal Leadership Convention/Ottawa (CBC)
Lloyd Robertson - CTV National News (CTV)
Kevin Newman - Global National (Global)

Best Reportage
Neil Macdonald, David Common, Bill Loucks - The National/CBC News - Haiti Watch/Hectic Haiti/Guy Philippe (CBC)
Alexei Sergeev, Michel Cormier - The National/CBC News - Georgia Protest: Tbilisi Tension/Tbilisi March/Tbilisi Aftermath (CBC)
Nahlah Ayed, Jim Hoffman - The National/CBC News - Report from Iraq/Mass Graves/Grave Stories (CBC)
Janis Mackey Frayer - CTV National News (CTV)
Rod Ellis, Lucien Millette, Lisa LaFlamme - CTV National News - Meat Inspectors (CTV)
Avis Favaro - CTV National News - Trans Fats (CTV)

Best Host or Interviewer in a News Information Program or Series
Evan Solomon - CBC News: Sunday (CBC)
Mark Kelley - CBC News: Disclosure - Cherry Bomb/File H-316/Blockbuster Science (CBC)
Craig Oliver - Question Period (CTV)
Dianne Buckner - Venture - Lawyer Sues Food Companies/The Corporation/AC Problems (CBC)
Wendy Mesley - Marketplace - Cellphone Controversy/Chiropractors & Vaccinations/Ritalin (CBC)

Best Host or Interviewer in a Lifestyle/General Interest or Talk Program or Series
Pete Luckett - The Food Hunter (Ocean Entertainment)
Debbie Travis - Debbie Travis' Facelift - Lawrence's Kids' Rooms/Nadia's Basement/Emma's Bachlorette (Whalley-Abbey Media) 
Marilyn Denis - CityLine (Citytv)
Evan Solomon - Hot Type (CBC Newsworld)
Carol Off - CounterSpin (CBC Newsworld)

Best Host or Interviewer in a Practical Information, or Performing Arts Program or Series
Shaun Majumder - Shaun's Great Adventure (CBC)
Ryley Alp - Broken House Chronicles - Ryley's Revenge (Mountain Road Productions)
Leigh Uttley - Broken House Chronicles - Ryley's Revenge (Mountain Road Productions)
George Brook - Broken House Chronicles - Ryley's Revenge (Mountain Road Productions)
Mike Holmes - Holmes on Homes (General Purpose Entertainment)
Karen Bertelsen - Stylin' Gypsies (W Network)

Best Host or Interviewer in a Sports Program or Sportscast
Ron MacLean - Hockey Night in Canada, Hockey Day in Canada (CBC Sports)
Scott Russell - 2003 UCI Road World Championships - Elite Men's Final (CBC Sports)
Josette Normandeau - Deadly Arts - Capoeira (Nintendo)
James Duthie - NHL on TSN - Pre-Game (TSN)
Tom Harrington - Sports Journal (CBC Sports)

Best Sports Play-by-Play or Analyst
Jim Hughson - 2003/04 Molson Canadian Canucks - Colorado Avalanche at Vancouver Canucks (Sportsnet)
Don Wittman - 2004 Nokia Brier (CBC Sports)
Pierre McGuire - NHL on TSN (TSN)

Best Photography in a Dramatic Program or Series
Rene Ohashi - Shattered City: The Halifax Explosion (CBC Television)
David Frazee - Cowboys and Indians: The J.J. Harper Story (High Definition Pictures/The Film Works/APTN/CBC)
David Frazee - Da Vinci’s Inquest - Bury My Own Bones (Haddock Entertainment/Barna-Alper Productions/Alliance Atlantis/CBC)
Les Erskine - Da Vinci’s Inquest - A Man When He's Down (Haddock Entertainment/Barna-Alper Productions/Alliance Atlantis/CBC)
Henry Chan - Human Cargo (Force Four Entertainment)
Peter Woeste - Stargate SG-1 - Nightwalkers (Stargate SG-1 Productions)

Best Photography in a Comedy, Variety, Performing Arts Program or Series
Kim Derko - Youkali Hotel (Enigmatico Films/Westwind Pictures)
André Turpin - Amelia (Amérimage-Spectra/Media Principia/Echo Media)
Paul Tolton - Shadow Pleasures (Eccentrics Things) 
Rudolf Blahacek - Death and the Maiden (Rhombus Media)

Best Photography in an Information Program or Series
Colin Allison - the fifth estate - Run For Your Life (CBC)
Ian Hannah - CBC News: Sunday (Canadian Broadcasting Corporation)
Aldo Columpsi - On the Road Again (CBC)
Henry Less - Made to Order (Mercer Street Films)
Brad Schewaga - The Thirsty Traveler (Grasslands Entertainment)

Best Photography in a Documentary Program or Series
John Walker - Men of the Deeps (CTV/John Walker Productions/Picture Plant/NFB)
Michael Grippo - Sleeping Tigers: The Asahi Baseball Story (NFB)
Claudine Sauvé - Short Infinity (NFB)
Susan Fleming, Keith Brust - Garden Mimics (Bullfrog Films)
Wayne Vallevand, Mike Rudyk - The Lone Trail: The Dogs and Drivers of the Yukon Quest (CBC)

Best Visual Effects
Don Urquhart, Claude Theriault, Colin Cunningham, Thomas Turnbull - Shattered City: The Halifax Explosion - Part 1 (CBC Television)
Brad Turner, Peter Hunt, Simon Lacey, Grant Lindsay - Andromeda - A Symmetry of Imperfection (Fireworks Entertainment/Tribune Entertainment/BLT Productions/Global/MBR Productions)
James Tichenor, Simon Ager, Michelle Comens, Adam de Bosch Kemper, Deborah Dunphy, Shannon Gurney, Krista McLean, Matthew Talbot-Kelly, Craig Van Den Biggelaar, Bruce Woloshyn - Stargate SG-1 - Redemption, Part 2 (Stargate SG-1 Productions)
James Tichenor, Simon Ager, Nicholas Boughen, Michelle Comens, Bruce Woloshyn, Tom Brydon, Matt Martell, Marc Roth, Wes Sargent - Stargate SG-1 - Descent (Stargate SG-1 Productions)
Clem Hobbs, Miles Horst, Donnie Anderson, Andy Russell - The Blobheads - Bringing Up Baby (Decode Entertainment)
Tony Coleman - National Geographic Channel Specials - Asteroid! The Doomsday Rock (CBC/Raincoast Storylines)

Best Picture Editing in a Dramatic Program or Series
Lisa Binkley - Human Cargo (Force Four Entertainment)
Lara Mazur - Da Vinci’s Inquest: "A Man When He's Down" (Haddock Entertainment/Barna-Alper Productions/Alliance Atlantis/CBC)
Christopher Donaldson - Slings & Arrows: "Madness in Great Ones" (Rhombus Media)
Teresa Hannigan - The Eleventh Hour "The Missionary Position" (Alliance Atlantis)
Jason Nielsen - renegadepress.com: "The Long Way Home" (Vérité Films)

Best Picture Editing in a Comedy, Variety, Performing Arts Program or Series
Édouard Lock - Amelia (Amérimage-Spectra/Media Principia/Echo Media)
Darel Fortin - The Planets (Amérimage-Spectra, Echo Media)
Jeff Bessner - From Time to Time
Andy Attalai - Shadow Pleasures (Eccentrics Things) 
Daryl K. Davis, Mike Munn - Youkali Hotel (Enigmatico Films/Westwind Pictures)

Best Picture Editing in an Information Program or Series
Loretta Hicks - the fifth estate - No Way Home (CBC)
Leslie Steven Onody - the fifth estate - Dead in the Water (CBC)
Kelly A. Morris - the fifth estate - Run For Your Life (CBC)
Mark Solnoky - CBC News: Disclosure - Blockbuster Science (CBC)
Jim Goertzen - CBC News: Disclosure - The Making of a Political Animal (CBC)
Nabil Mehchi, Andrew Kemp - Debbie Travis' Facelift - DJ's Garden (Whalley-Abbey Media)

Best Picture Editing in a Documentary Program or Series
Nick Hector - Dying at Grace (TVOntario)
Wayne Abbott - From a Place Called War: 1939-1945 (Northern Sky Entertainment) 
Richard Comeau - Short Infinity (NFB)
Marc Robichaud, Tony Coleman - The Canadian Experience: Expo '67: Back to the Future (CBC)
Marke Slipp - Totem: The Return of the G'psgolox Pole (NFB)

Best Production Design or Art Direction in a Dramatic Program or Series
Lawrence Collett - Human Cargo (Force Four Entertainment) 
Donna Noonan - Bliss - Steph’s Life (Galafilm/Back Alley Film Productions)
Craig Sandells - The Shields Stories - Dolls, Dolls, Dolls, Dolls (Shaftesbury Films)
Matthew Davies - Elizabeth Rex (Rhombus Media)
Matthew Davies - The Incredible Mrs. Ritchie (Showtime Networks/Nomadic Pictures)
Sandra Kybartas - This Is Wonderland - Episode 8 (Muse Entertainment/Indian Grove Productions)

Best Production Design or Art Direction in a Non-Dramatic Program or Series
Astrid Janson - Shadow Pleasures (Eccentrics Things) 
Rhonda Moscoe - From Time to Time
Brendan Smith - Puppets Who Kill - The Twilight Place (Eggplant Picture & Sound)
Stephen Osler, Tom Anthes - This Hour Has 22 Minutes - Episode 1 (Salter Street Films/CBC)
Hugh Shankland - Youkali Hotel (Enigmatico Films/Westwind Pictures)

Best Costume Design
Lyn Kelly, Diana Cilliers - Human Cargo (Force Four Entertainment) 
Trysha Bakker - Shattered City: The Halifax Explosion (CBC Television)
Brenda Shenher - Corner Gas - I Love Lacey (CTV/Prairie Pants Productions)
Charlotte Penner - The Shields Stories - Dolls, Dolls, Dolls, Dolls (Shaftesbury Films)
Patti Bain Parsons - This Hour Has 22 Minutes - Episode 1 (Salter Street Films/CBC)

Best Achievement in Make-Up
Debra Johnson, Gérald Altenburg, Mary Monforte - Elizabeth Rex (Rhombus Media)
Beverley Keigher - Da Vinci’s Inquest - Bury My Own Bones (Haddock Entertainment/Barna-Alper Productions/Alliance Atlantis/CBC)
Marilyn O'Quinn, Zinka Shankland - The Eleventh Hour - Hard Seven (Alliance Atlantis)
Karen Byers, Penny Lee - This Hour Has 22 Minutes - Episode 1 (Salter Street Films/CBC)
Elizabeth Kuchurean - Shattered City: The Halifax Explosion (CBC Television)

Best Sound in a Dramatic Program
Martin Lee, Steve Hammond, Tom Bjelic, Allan Fung, Doug Johnston, Ian Rankin, John Douglas Smith - Shattered City: The Halifax Explosion (CBC Television)
John Hazen, Mark Gingras, Steve Hammond, Leon Johnson, John Laing, Tim O’Connell - Cowboys and Indians: The J.J. Harper Story (High Definition Pictures/The Film Works/APTN/CBC)
Tony Gronick, Hennie Britton, Michael P. Keeping, Conrad Kuhne, Brent Marchenski, Vince Renaud, Clive Turner, Joseph Rossi - Human Cargo (Force Four Entertainment) 
Tom Bjelic, Georges Hannan, Don Dickson, Allan Fung, John Sievert, Mark Wright, John Douglas Smith - Open Heart (Barna-Alper/Dreamsmith Entertainment/Movie Central/CBC)

Best Sound in a Dramatic Series
Louis Hone, Paul Hubert, Gabor Vadnay, Stan Sakellaropoulos, Peter Lopata - Bliss - Steph’s Life (Galafilm/Back Alley Film Productions)
Eric Fitz, Grant Bone, Erik Culp, Steve Hammond, Jack Heeren, John Douglas Smith, Adam Roberts - Blue Murder - Eyewitness (Barna-Alper Productions/Canwest/North Bend Films)
Dino Pigat, Eric Apps, Paul Germann, Alastair Gray, Steve Kostick, Brian Newby, Donna G. Powell - The Eleventh Hour - Wonderland (Alliance Atlantis)
Rob Bryanton, Jeff Hamon, Evan Rust, Warren St. Onge - renegadepress.com - Out in the Open (Vérité Films)
Janice Ierulli, Susan Fairbairn, Leon Johnson, Sid Lieberman, Brent MacLean, Ian Rankin, Lou Solakofski - The Shields Stories - The Harp (Shaftesbury Films)

Best Sound in a Comedy, Variety, or Performing Arts Program or Series
David Hillier, Martin Lee, Alex Salter, Lou Solakofski - Men of the Deeps (CTV/John Walker Productions/Picture Plant/NFB)
Daniel Pellerin, Elma Bello, Stefan Fraticelli, Daniel Hamood, Goro Koyama, Stephen Marian, Scott Shepherd - Puppets Who Kill - The Twilight Place (Eggplant Picture & Sound)
Neal Gaudet, Kenny MacDonald, Bob Melanson, Brian Power, Lil Thomas, P.J. MacNeil - This Hour Has 22 Minutes - Episode 1 (Salter Street Films/CBC)
Norm Lussier - Paul Brandt Presents
Damian Kearns, Danny Greenspoon, Doug Doctor, Doug McClement, Howard Baggley, Jeremy Darby - 2003 Canada Day Evening Show (National Capital Commission/Canadian Heritage/CBC)

Best Sound in an Information/Documentary Program or Series
Marie-Claude Gagné, Hubert Macé de Gastines - The Nature of Things - Arctic Mission (CBC)
Damian Kearns, Joe Passaretti - the fifth estate - Dead in the Water (CBC)
Steve Cupani - City of Ruins: The Halifax Explosion (CBC)
Loïc Thériault, Sylvain Brassard, Vivian Savoy, Dany Ouellet, Benoît Dame - Deadly Arts (Nintendo)
Emil Jany - Frontiers of Construction - Road Warriors (Ragged Earth Productions/Barna-Alper Productions)

Best Original Music Score for a Program or Mini-Series
Daniel Séguin, James Jandrisch - Human Cargo (Force Four Entertainment) 
Christopher Dedrick - Elizabeth Rex (Rhombus Media)
Robert Carli - Open Heart (Barna-Alper/Dreamsmith Entertainment/Movie Central/CBC)
Christopher Dedrick - Shattered City: The Halifax Explosion (CBC Television)

Best Original Music Score for a Dramatic Series
Ron Sures - The Eleventh Hour - Hard Seven (Alliance Atlantis)
Luc Arsenault - Chilly Beach - Invasion of the Beer Snatchers (March Entertainment)
Ron Sures - Slings & Arrows - A Mirror Up To Nature (Rhombus Media)
Christopher Dedrick - The Shields Stories - A Wood (Shaftesbury Films)
Brian Carson, Ari Wise - Silverwing - Dark Alliance (Bardel Entertainment/Philippine Animation Studio)

Best Original Music Score for a Documentary Program or Series
Robert Carli - Galileo's Sons (Bullfrog Films)
Jean-Louis Valéro - Korea: The Unfinished War - Burnt Ground (TVOntario)
Chris Crilly - Short Infinity (NFB)
Ben Johannesen, Geoff Bennett - Garden Mimics (Bullfrog Films)
Clode Hamelin - Totem: The Return of the G'psgolox Pole (NFB)

Special Awards
Gordon Sinclair Award for Broadcast Journalism - Neil Docherty
Earle Grey Award - Graham Greene
Margaret Collier Award - Wayne Grigsby
Gemini Award for Outstanding Technical Achievement - Majestic (Dome Productions)
Canada Award: Anand Ramayya, Joseph MacDonald, Cosmic Current
Gemini Humanitarian Award - George R. Robertson
Viewer's Choice Award for Lifestyle Host: Mike Holmes, Holmes on Homes 
Gemini Award for Most Popular Website Competition: Michael Prini, Alexia Patton, Sarah Richardson - www.roomservice.ca

References

Gemini Awards
Gemini Awards, 2004
Gemini Awards